Clayton Van Lydegraf (May 6, 1915 – March 30, 1992) was a writer and activist of significant influence on the New Left in the 1960s.  He served as Secretary of the Communist Party in Washington State in the late 1940s.

Van Lydegraf served as a leader of the Progressive Labor Party (United States) in Washington state in the 1960s before being expelled in the Spring of 1967. During this time, and expanding on his Old Left background, Van Lydegraf was involved with young Seattle activists by 1966. His articles "The Movement and the Workers" and "The Object is to Win" were particularly influential.  This latter is a noteworthy piece in the development of the ideas of the Weather Underground.

Over the years, he was active in a number of groups and causes including the Communist Party, the Progressive Labor Party, the Peace and Freedom Party, Draft Resistance- Seattle, Students for a Democratic Society (SDS), American Friends Service Committee, Anti-Fascist Front, Seattle Committee to End the War in Vietnam, and trade unions.  He was also an advocate of working class power, Marxism, revolutionary organization, and the Black Panthers.  He took part in the preparations for the jailbreak of Timothy Leary while in the Weatherman organization but was privately critical of the action.

References

External links

Papers from Van Lydegraf dated 1944–1991 are housed at the University of Washington Special Collections Library.
 Link to the Finding Aid for the Clayton Van Lydegraf Papers at the University of Washington Library's Special Collections
The papers include
"Excerpt from appearance before House Un-American Activities Committee (HUAC) hearing", December 13, 1956, Seattle.
"U.S. Imperialism and the Fascist Danger", 1967.  Second edition, 1969.
"The Object is to Win", 1967. Third edition, 1971.
"The Movement and the Workers", 1969. Second edition, 1972.
"Statement to the San Francisco Grand Jury" January – February 1973.
"Our Constitutional Rights- A written statement submitted to the San Francisco Grand Jury", January - February 1973.

American activists
1915 births
1992 deaths
20th-century American non-fiction writers